Han changhoon (This is the author's preferred Romanization per LTI Korea,) is a South Korean author.

Life
Han changhoon was born in 1963 in the seaport town of Yeosu, and graduated from Hannam University with a degree in Regional Development. He made his literary debut in 1992 with “An Anchor” which was published in Daejeon Daily Newspaper.

Work
The characters in Han's works cherish the memory of the lonely seascape in their hearts: blue-black waves, desolate, wind-swept beach, fishermen's leathery hands—these images constitute the picture of home for those who lead sorrowful lives in the impoverished countryside or at the periphery of glittering cities. Island, I Live the End of the World feature twelve stories narrated by a man who lives alone on an island. A woman visits the island in remembrance of her lost love; an old man lost at sea drifts as far down south as the island of Jeju; an abusive husband is reunited with his runaway wife on a moonlit beach—in these stories, the sea is not a mere backdrop but the very manifestation of life that offers an insight into the secret of existence.

Han refrains from sententiousness despite the fact that his works explore the suffering of the socially and economically underprivileged: with his characteristic humility and sensitivity, Han discovers beauty and psychological subtleties inherent in every situation and allows his characters an amount of optimism and ultimate faith in the goodness of human nature with which they brave the difficulties of life.

Awards
 3rd Hankyoreh Literature Prize, 1998 (for his novel Mussels)

Works in Korean (partial)
Novels 
 Mussels (홍합). Seoul: Hankyoreh Publishing, 1998. .
 Island, I Live the End of the World (섬, 나는 세상 끝을 산다). Seoul;: Changbi Publishers, 2003. .

Short story collections 
 The Reason For Ocean’s Beauty (바다가 아름다운 이유). Seoul: Sol, 1996. .
 Looking at a Passing Bird (가던새본다). Seoul: Changbi Publishers, 1998. .
 The Person Who Went to the End of the Earth (세상의 끝으로 간 사람). Seoul: Munhak Tongne, 2001. .

References 

1963 births
Living people
Hannam University alumni
South Korean writers
South Korean male short story writers
South Korean short story writers